Tata Chemicals Limited is an Indian global company with interests in chemicals, crop protection and specialty chemistry products headquartered in Mumbai, India. The company is one of the largest chemical companies in India with operations in India, Europe, North America and Africa. Tata Chemicals is a subsidiary of Tata Group conglomerate. Tata Chemicals has a publicly listed subsidiary called Rallis India.

History and operations 
Tata Chemicals is the second largest soda ash production capacity plant in India. This was the second soda ash plant built in India by Kapilram Vakil (Grandson of late Indian justice Nanabhai Haridas) that started operating in the year 1944. The township Mithapur, derives its name from "Mitha" which means salt in Gujarati language.

Since 2006 Tata Chemicals has owned Brunner Mond, a United Kingdom-based chemical company with operations in Magadi (Kenya) and General Chemicals, in United States of America.

On 27 March 2008, Tata Chemicals Ltd acquired 100 per cent With all these acquisitions, combined capacity of production has increased to around 5.17 million tons of soda ash.

In April 2010, Tata Chemicals acquired 25% stake in ammonia-urea fertilizer complex in Gabon for 290 million. The first phase of the plant will have a full operational capacity of 2.2 billion tons of ammonia and 3.85 billion tons of urea per day.

In 2019, Tata Group transferred Tata Chemicals' branded food business to Tata Global Beverages (now Tata Consumer Products), in an all shares deal. 

In 2016, Tata Chemicals sold its urea business to Pune-based Yara India, part of the Norwegian chemical company, Yara International.

In 2022, Tata Chemicals, through its subsidiary, Tata Chemicals Europe set up the UK's first industrial-scale carbon capture and usage plant. The plant can capture 40,000 tonnes of carbon dioxide per annum.

Plant locations 
Mithapur (Gujarat)
Cuddalore (Tamil Nadu)
Mambattu (Andhra Pradesh)
Dholera (Gujarat)
Northwich, Cheshire (United Kingdom)
Green River, Wyoming (United States)
Magadi (Kenya)

Research and Development Center
The Research and Development Center Tata Chemicals Innovation Center located at Pune, Maharashtra started operations in 2004. The team of scientists is working in the following areas: Food Science & Technology, Advanced Materials, Green Chemistry, Biochemicals, Metabolites, and Nutraceuticals. Other innovation centers include Rallis Innovation Chemistry Hub (RICH) and Metahelix Life Sciences in Bengaluru, and Tata Chemicals R&D Centre in Mithapur, Gujarat.

Product range

Basic Chemistry Products – Soda ash, Sodium bicarbonate, Caustic soda, Chlorine, Liquid bromine, Gypsum, Phosphoric acid, Cement and Sulphuric acids.
Energy Sciences Products – Li-ion battery packs and recycling of spent Li-ion batteries.
Nutritional Sciences Products – Tata NQ offers nature-inspired and science-backed ingredient and formulation solutions catering to human and animal health.
Material Sciences Products – Nano Zinc Oxide and Specialty silica.
Agro Sciences Products – Crop protection and nutrition, animal nutrition, seeds, household products and contract manufacturing.

Rallis India 
Rallis India is a subsidiary of Tata Chemicals, and is listed on both the National Stock Exchange and the Bombay Stock Exchange. Rallis India operates in the agriculture sector and has an India focused business, an international focused business, and a seeds business. Both the India and international businesses focus on crop nutrition and crop protection products. The international business also offers active ingredients, formulations and contract manufacturing services.

References

External links
 

Tata Chemicals
Tata Sons subsidiaries
Chemical companies of India
Chemical companies established in 1939
1939 establishments in British India
Companies listed on the National Stock Exchange of India
Companies listed on the Bombay Stock Exchange